D'Angela Dia Simms is an American business executive. In 2020, Simms was appointed as Chief Executive Officer of Lobos 1707 Tequila & Mezcal. She was previously the president of Combs Enterprises, a position she had held since May 15, 2017. Simms was appointed to this position by Combs Enterprises founder and CEO, Sean Combs, and was the first person to assume the role of president at the company.

As a native of Queens, New York, and now residing in Baltimore, Maryland, she is a graduate of Morgan State University, Maryland and the Florida Institute of Technology.

Early life and education
Simms was born D'Angela Banks in Monterey, California. Her family moved to Queens, New York, when she was at an early age. While living there, she attended St. Francis Preparatory School. When Simms was nine years old, her mother was diagnosed with multiple sclerosis (MS). Her mother’s resilience in the face of adversity would serve as a role model as she grew older.

In 1999, Simms attained a Bachelor’s degree in Psychology (B.S.) from Morgan State University in Baltimore, Maryland. She attained her Master’s degree in Management from Florida Institute of Technology and is Level II-certified by the Defense Acquisition University.

Career

Simms began her career as a contract specialist at the U.S. Department of Defense. Following this, Simms moved into advertising and co-founded Madison Marketing Inc. She later worked in sales for GlaxoSmithKline and at Clear Channel, where two of her accounts were Bad Boy Records and Sean John. Simms started working for Combs as an assistant in 2005. She has also served as chief of staff, General Manager of The Blue Flame Agency, executive vice president and president of Combs Wine & Spirits. She was promoted to this role in February, 2015. As president of Combs Wines & Spirits, Simms was involved in the acquisition of DeLeón Tequila and its brand relaunch, as well as the brand growth of Cîroc vodka. She was promoted to president of  Combs Enterprises on May 15, 2017, and is the first person in that role. She oversaw the company's various businesses, including Bad Boy Entertainment, Sean John, Combs Wine & Spirits (CÎROC Ultra Premium Vodka and DeLeón Tequila), AQUAhydrate, the Blue Flame advertising and marketing agency, Bad Boy Touring, Janice Combs Publishing, Revolt Films and Revolt TV, as well as ENYCE, and the Combs Foundation. Combs Wine & Spirits had been created in 2013 and folded into Combs Enterprises when Simms was promoted to president as she oversaw both ventures.
 
Simms notes that throughout her entire career, she has been in male-dominated industries. She has explained, “As a woman, it is important to feel like you can embrace your femininity — be ladylike and powerful simultaneously.“

Simms left Combs Enterprises in September 2019 to enter into the cannabis industry and start her own business ventures. In October 2019, Simms spoke with Marie Claire on her venture into the cannabis industry with BRN Group.

Simms is also a board member for TILT Holdings  and in 2020, she invested in the women-led Saint Liberty Whiskey.

Simms launched Lobos 1707 Tequila & Mezcal alongside Diego Osorio and LeBron James in November 2020. She is currently the Chief Executive Officer and is a part of brand’s “Wolfpack,” used to refer to the leadership team.

Honors
Simms was recognized by The Network Journal in their “40 Under Forty Class of 2010”. In 2011, she was an honoree at the United Way of New York City's “Power of Women Luncheon”. Also in 2011, Simms was named a “Leader of the New School” by Essence Magazine. In 2014, Simms won the Bronze Stevie “Maverick of the Year Award” at the International Business Awards.

Simms is a member of Network for Teaching Entrepreneurship and serves on the board of the Boys and Girls Club of Harlem, the Women’s Employment Opportunity Project, Grace Reformed Church, and Daddy’s House Social Programs.

Personal life
Simms married her husband, Keith, in 2007. They have one daughter. She lives with her family in Howard County, Maryland, and currently commutes weekly from her home to New York City to fulfill her work commitments.

References

External links 

 

21st-century American businesspeople
Businesspeople from New York (state)
Living people
People from Monterey, California
Morgan State University alumni
Florida Institute of Technology alumni
Defense Acquisition University alumni
African-American business executives
American business executives
African-American women in business
American women business executives
Year of birth missing (living people)
21st-century American businesswomen
21st-century African-American women
21st-century African-American people